Epinotia sotipena, the black dash epinotia moth, is a species of tortricid moth in the family Tortricidae.

The MONA or Hodges number for Epinotia sotipena is 3291.1.

References

Further reading

External links

 

Eucosmini
Moths described in 1986